Tobias Scherbarth (born 17 August 1985) is a German athlete specialising in the pole vault.

His personal bests in the event are 5.73 metres outdoors (Phoenix 2014) and 5.7662 metres indoors (Stuttgart 2009).

Competition record

References

1985 births
Living people
Athletes from Leipzig
German male pole vaulters
World Athletics Championships athletes for Germany
Athletes (track and field) at the 2016 Summer Olympics
Olympic athletes of Germany
Competitors at the 2007 Summer Universiade
Competitors at the 2009 Summer Universiade